Papo Colo (born August 12, 1946) is a Puerto Rican performance artist, painter, writer, and curator. He was born in San Juan, Puerto Rico. He lives and works in New York City and in El Yunque rainforest in Puerto Rico. Papo Colo is an interdisciplinary artist, whose work ranges from performance, theater and installation art to painting, writing, and graphic design.

Early life and career
At 18 he left natal Puerto Rico as a merchant marine. After returning to the island in 1971, he falsified a diploma from the University of Puerto Rico as his first conceptual art piece. In New York he studied under the tutelage of the poet Nicanor Parra at Columbia University. His interest in pre-Columbian and Latin American cultures led him to travel across Mexico for a year. From 1973 through 1980 he lived and worked between New York City and Barcelona. During these years he did a series of performances involving physical endurance with political undertones. He is best known for Superman 51, which consisted of the artist running with 51 blocks tied to his back on the West Side Highway until exhaustion. His father, Francisco Colon Garcia, was a boxing champion and his exposure to the glorification of the body through boxing was influential to his work.

Exit Art 
In 1982 Papo Colo, with Jeanette Ingberman, founded Exit Art, an internationally known cultural center in New York City. In 1992 he founded the Trickster Theater, an experimental multilingual and multicultural theater company. The company served as an integral part of Exit Art's discourse and was held on the lower level of its facilities. In 2005 he wrote and directed Mplay, a theater piece created solely for the web. He has won numerous awards including The New York Times Best Inaugural Show by an Alternative Art Space for his exhibition Exit Biennial: Reconstruction  Additionally, REACTIONS, an international response to 9/11 conceived by Papo Colo, was acquired by The Library of Congress for its permanent collection Jeanette Ingberman died August 24, 2011 from complications of leukemia.

Career as an artist 
Besides being the curator and cultural producer of Exit Art, Papo Colo has organized over 100 shows in which he was also the exhibition and graphic designer. His work has been exhibited at numerous venues, including The Clocktower (2013), Galeria de la Raza, San Francisco and MoMA PS1, New York (both 2009), El Museo del Barrio (2008), National Gallery of Puerto Rico (2007), Grey Art Gallery (2006), Art in General (2006), RISD Museum, Providence (2005), Barnes Foundation (2017), Band the Bass Museum of Art, Miami Beach (2001). The retrospective of his early work at MoMA PS1, which was organized by Klaus Biesenbach, coincided with The Cleaner, a new work the artist performed in New York’s Chelsea neighborhood, and culminated with the performance event Procesión Migración that reflected on the constant Puerto Rican migration to the mainland. The artist is establishing Pangea Art Republic, a new alternative art space in El Yunque Rainforest.

Selected exhibitions

Solo
2009:  Jumping the Fences, Galería de la Raza: San Francisco, CA

Group
2005: Island Nations , Rhode Island School of Design Museum: Providence, RI
2006: The Downtown Show, Grey Art Gallery: New York, NY

References

Puerto Rican artists
People from San Juan, Puerto Rico
Living people
1946 births